Gabriele Baldocci (born May 10, 1980 in Livorno, Italy) is an Italian pianist and composer naturalised British.

Baldocci is known worldwide for performing with the legendary Argentinean pianist Martha Argerich

After studying with Ilio Barontini, Franco Scala, William Grant Naboré, and Sergio Perticaroli and having studied with or having been coached by Alicia De Larrocha, Leon Fleisher, and  Dmitri Bashkirov at the International Piano Academy Lake Como, Baldocci began an intense solo career performing in important venues worldwide (Tonhalle in Zurich, Teatro Colón in Buenos Aires, Sala Verdi in Milan). His large repertoire ranges from Bach to contemporary music and is especially focused on the composers of the Romantic Period such as Fryderyk Chopin (of whom he has recorded the complete Ballades and Impromptus), Franz Liszt, and Robert Schumann. In 2012 he began recording and performing the complete Beethoven Symphonies transcribed by Liszt for piano solo.

Very active as a chamber musician, he has performed with Ivry Gitlis, Marco Fornaciari, Mark Drobinsky, and other great names of the international music scene. 
Baldocci has toured extensively in duo with Martha Argerich, his good friend and mentor.

Since 2008 he has formed a stable piano duo with the Argentinean pianist Daniel Rivera; they have performed at important music Festivals around the world.

Since 2010 he has been artistic director and Ambassador of the Martha Argerich Presents Project (MAPp), an ambitious project launched by Argerich to encourage cooperation between famous artists and young talented musicians in order to create a worldwide circuit of performances and pedagogy.

More recently, Gabriele Baldocci has advanced his career as a conductor, collaborating with important orchestras in Europe and America, and he cultivates his interest for cinema producing and directing short and feature movies.

In 2016 he played keyboard in the Progressive Rock band The Gift, publishing the album "Why the Sea Is Salt" for Bad Elephant Music.

Baldocci is a Piano Professor at Trinity Laban Conservatoire of Music and Dance after six years spent at the Potenza Conservatory of Music  and he is the Director of the London Piano Centre  and of the Milton Keynes Music Academy.

References

External links
Baldocci Official Webpage
Martha Argerich Presents Project official page

1980 births
Living people
Italian classical pianists
Male classical pianists
Italian male pianists
People from Livorno
21st-century classical pianists
21st-century Italian male musicians